Bellbird Heights is a locality in the City of Cessnock in the Hunter Region of New South Wales, Australia. It was first subdivided in 1923 as Crossing Estate, and was gazetted as Bellbird Heights in 1971. In 2016 the population was 788, median age was 40 and 87.5% were born in Australia.

References 

Suburbs of City of Cessnock
Towns in the Hunter Region